"Trust" is the first single released from hip hop group The Pharcyde's third album Plain Rap. It peaked at #15 on Hot Rap Tracks.

References

2000 singles
2000 songs
The Pharcyde songs